The Stomachetosellidae is a family within the bryozoan order Cheilostomatida. Colonies are encrusting on shells and rocks or upright bilaminar branches or sheets. The zooids generally have at least one adventitious avicularia on their frontal wall near the orifice. The frontal wall is usually covered with small pores and numerous larger pores along the margin. The ovicell, which broods the larvae internally, is double-layered with numerous pores in the outer layer, and sits quite prominently on the frontal wall of the next zooid.

Classification 

 Family Stomachetosellidae
 Genus Cigclisula
 Genus Cycloperiella
 Genus Fatkullina
 Genus Junerossia
 Genus Lepralioides
 Genus Pachyegis
 Genus Metradolium
 Genus Metrocrypta
 Genus Schizemiella
 Genus Stephanotrema
 Genus Stomachetosella
 Genus Trematooecia
 Genus Tremoschizodina

References 

Cheilostomatida
Bryozoan families
Extant Eocene first appearances